Orthochromis kalungwishiensis is a species of cichlid endemic to Zambia, where it is only known from the Kalungwishi River, a major tributary of Lake Mweru in the upper Congo River basin.  This species can reach a length of  SL.

References

External links 

kalungwishiensis
Cichlid fish of Africa
Fish of Zambia
Fish described in 1994